Catharsius capucinus, is a species of dung beetle found in India, Sri Lanka, Bangladesh and Nepal.

Description
Average length if about 18 to 26 mm has a shortly oval, and very convex body. Dorsum black and shiny. Pronotum opaque, whereas red color antennae, and mouthparts, are hairy clothing throughout the legs. Head semi-circular with a horn in male. The horn curves gradually forward to the tip. Female head bears a slightly transversely triangular elevation without horn. Clypeus feebly excised and closely strigose. Pronotum bears a slight sharp conical protuberance in male. But in female, pronotum has feeble indications of the four tubercles found in the male. Elytra distinctly striate with punctures. Pygidium sparsely punctured.

References 

Scarabaeinae
Insects of Sri Lanka
Insects of India
Insects described in 1781